William Sutherland Maxwell  (November 14, 1874 – March 25, 1952) was a well-known Canadian architect and a Hand of the Cause in the Baháʼí Faith. He was born in Montreal, Quebec, Canada to parents Edward John Maxwell and Johan MacBean.

Life

Education

After attending the High School of Montreal, at the age of 18 he started working for his brother's office in the Sun Life Building in Montreal.  In 1895 he left for Boston where he spent three years in the office of Winslow and Wetherel; in the evenings he would study at the Boston Architectural Club. At the Boston Architectural Club he met Constant-Désiré Despradelles, Professor of Design at MIT (1892–1912), who exposed him to the Beaux-Arts architecture style.

In 1898 he returned to his brother Edward's office for fifteen months, after which he spent a year and a half in Paris, where he was accepted as a student in the atelier of Jean-Louis Pascal at the École des Beaux-Arts, under whom Despradelles had also studied. Maxwell then returned to Canada in December 1900.

Professional life

In 1902 he became a partner in his brother's firm. During his time with the firm, the firm won contracts to design the Commissions for the Nurses Home of the Royal Victoria Hospital in Montreal, the Saskatchewan Legislative Buildings, the Art Association of Montreal (renamed the Montreal Museum of Fine Arts), and the Departmental and Courts Buildings Ottawa in 1907 (unexecuted).

In 1891? he was accepted in the new association of architects. He designed the Board of Trade Building in Montreal, and the Saint-Louis, and Riverview wings of the Château Frontenac in Quebec City when it was expanded, and the new art gallery in Montreal. Among the many other designs, he also designed important hotels for the Canadian Pacific Railway adjoining their existing stations in Winnipeg and Calgary.

As a Baháʼí

In Paris Maxwell had met Mason Remey and Randolph Bolles who introduced him to the Baháʼí Faith.  Later Maxwell married Bolles' sister May Ellis Bolles in London on 8 May 1902, and became a Baháʼí in 1909, after meeting ʻAbdu'l-Bahá, the son of the founder of the Baháʼí Faith. The Maxwell's home in Montreal became a centre of Baháʼí activity in Canada, and in 1912 ʻAbdu'l-Bahá visited their home.  The Maxwells would frequently visit the Baháʼí World Centre in Haifa, Palestine (current day Israel).

In 1937 the Maxwells' daughter, Mary Maxwell, married Shoghi Effendi, then head of the Baháʼí Faith. After Mrs. Maxwell's death in 1940, Mr. Maxwell left to Haifa, where he remained throughout the Second World War. While in Haifa he designed the arcade and superstructure of the Shrine of the Báb, one of the holiest places for members of the Baháʼí Faith.

For this work and for his long devotion to the Baháʼí Faith he was recognized as a Hand of the Cause of God by Shoghi Effendi in December 1951. After his death in 1952 the south door of the Shrine of the Báb was named after him. William Maxwell had returned to Montreal the year before he died and he was buried 29 March 1952 in Mount Royal Cemetery.

Professional associations

In 1908 he became a Councillor of the Province of Quebec Association of Architects, in 1909 an Associate of the Royal Canadian Academy, in 1913 President of the Arts Club, in 1914 President of the Province of Quebec Association of Architects and an Academician of the Royal Canadian Academy, in 1928 a Fellow of the Royal Institute of British Architects (RIBA), in 1935 President of the Royal Architectural Institute of Canada (RAIC) and finally in 1938 Vice-president of the Royal Canadian Academy.

References

External links

The Architecture of Edward & W.S. Maxwell: The Canadian Legacy, John Bland Canadian Architecture Collection, McGill University Library 
Historic Places in Canada
 

Canadian architects
Hands of the Cause
Canadian Bahá'ís
Architects from Montreal
1874 births
1952 deaths
Members of the Royal Canadian Academy of Arts
Beaux-Arts architecture in Canada
Canadian alumni of the École des Beaux-Arts
Converts to the Bahá'í Faith
20th-century Bahá'ís
Boston Architectural College alumni
High School of Montreal alumni
Burials at Mount Royal Cemetery